The Diamond A Ranch, near Roswell, New Mexico, is a historic ranch.  A portion of the ranch less than one acre in size, including two contributing buildings dating from the late 1880s or early 1890s, was listed on the National Register of Historic Places in 1988.

The bunkhouse is also built of stone;  both have pitched metal roofs.

References

National Register of Historic Places in New Mexico
Buildings and structures completed in 1883
Chaves County, New Mexico